Adam Rogers is an American jazz guitarist.

Early life
The son of Broadway performers and musicians, he began playing piano and drums at just 5 or 6. He became "obsessed" with Jimi Hendrix and began collecting Hendrix recordings after starting guitar at age 11. He listened a great deal to the Hendrix recordings, and by 14 had learned to play in the style of Hendrix. It was at this time that he was exposed to the music of Charlie Parker, John Coltrane, Miles Davis and Wes Montgomery and began to study Jazz music. His jazz guitar teachers have included John Scofield and Barry Galbraith.

Development
For five years, Rogers studied classical guitar at Mannes School of Music. Beginning in the 1990s, he spent over ten years as a member of the jazz fusion band Lost Tribe with David Binney, David Gilmore, Fima Ephron, and Ben Perowsky. For several years he was a member of Michael Brecker's bands, and was a founding member of the quartet Forq. He leads a quartet and the trio Dice.

He has also worked with Kenny Barron, Brian Blade, Walter Becker, Michael Brecker & Randy Brecker, Ravi Coltrane, Christian McBride, Uri Caine, James Carter, Regina Carter, Larry Coryell, Eliane Elias, Marcus Miller, Joe Jackson, George Russell, David Sanchez, Bill Evans, Gil Evans Orchestra, Forq, Norah Jones, Jack McDuff, Mingus Big Band, John Patitucci, Chris Potter, Paul Simon, Alex Sipiagin, Phillip Bailey, Kenny Werner, Cassandra Wilson, Lizz Wright, and John Zorn. He is currently the newest tour member with Steely Dan on their Earth After Hours 2022 tour.

Discography

As leader or co-leader
 Art of the Invisible (Criss Cross, 2002)
 Allegory (Criss Cross, 2003)
 Structure (ACT, 2004)
 Apparitions (Criss Cross, 2005)
 Time and the Infinite (Criss Cross, 2007)
 Heaven on Earth (Half Note, 2009)
 Sight (Criss Cross, 2009)
 R&B  (Criss Cross, 2015)
 Dice (Adraj, 2017)

With Lost Tribe
 Lost Tribe (Windham Hill, 1993)
 Soulfish (High Street 1994)
 Many Lifetimes (Arabesque, 1998)

As sideman 

With David Binney
 Point Game (Owl, 1990)
 Free to Dream (Mythology, 1998)
 South (ACT, 2001)
 Afinidad with Edward Simon (Red, 2001)
 Balance (ACT, 2002)
 Welcome to Life (Mythology, 2004)
 Out of Airplanes (Mythology, 2006)
 Oceanos with Edward Simon (Criss Cross, 2007)
 Anacapa (Criss Cross, 2014)

With Ralph Bowen
 Dedicated (Posi-Tone, 2009)
 Due Reverence (Posi-Tone, 2010)

With Randy Brecker 
 Into the Sun (Concord, 1997)
 Hangin' in the City (ESC, 2001)
 34th N Lex (ESC, 2003)
 The Brecker Brothers Band Reunion (Piloo, 2013)
 Randy Pop! (Piloo, 2015)

With Regina Carter
 Reverse Thread (E1, 2010)
 Southern Comfort (Sony, 2014)

With Scott Colley 
 Initial Wisdom (Palmetto, 2002)
 Architect of the Silent Moment (CAM Jazz, 2007)

With Alana Davis
 Fortune Cookies (Elektra, 2001)
 Surrender Dorothy (Tigress/Telarc, 2005)

With Bill Evans
 Live in Europe (Lipstick, 1995)
 Starfish & The Moon (Escapade Music, 1997)
 Touch (ESC, 1999)

With Giora Feidman
 The Dance of Joy (plaene, 1992)
 Klassic Klezmer (plaene, 1993)
 Klezmer Celebration (plaene, 1997)

With Phillip Johnston
 Phillip Johnston's Big Trouble (Black Saint, 1993)
 Music for Films (Tzadik, 1998)

With Norah Jones
 Come Away with Me (Parlophone, 2002)
 Turn Me On (Blue Note, 2002)

With David Krakauer 
 Klezmer Madness! (Tzadik, 1995)
 Klezmer, NY (Tzadik, 1998)

With Monday Michiru
 Episodes in Color (SAR, 2002)
 Naked Breath (ArtistShare, 2004)
 My Ever Changing Moods (Geneon, 2008)
 Nexus (Pony Canyon, 2008)
 Don't Disturb This Groove (Grand Gallery 2011)
 Soulception (Adventure Music, 2012)

With John Patitucci
 Line by Line (Concord Jazz, 2006)
 Brooklyn (Three Faces, 2015)

With Yelena Eckemoff
 In the Shadow of a Cloud (L & H Production, 2017)
 I Am a Stranger in This World (L & H Production, 2022)

With Chris Potter
 Traveling Mercies (Verve, 2002)
 Underground (Sunnyside, 2006)
 Follow the Red Line (Sunnyside, 2007)
 Ultrahang (ArtistShare, 2009)
 Imaginary Cities (ECM, 2015)

With Edward Simon
 Simplicitas (Criss Cross, 2005)
 Sorrows & Triumphs (Sunnyside, 2018)

With Alex Sipiagin
 Images (TCB, 1998) – recorded in 1996
 Mirrors (Criss Cross, 2003) – recorded in 2002
 Returning (Criss Cross, 2005)
 Out of the Circle (ArtistShare, 2007)
 Generations: Dedicated to Woody Shaw (Criss Cross, 2010)
 Balance (Criss Cross, 2015)

With others
 Walter Becker, 11 Tracks of Whack (Giant, 1994)
 John Zorn, John Zorn's Cobra: Live at the Knitting Factory (Knitting Factory 1995) – live recorded in 1992
 Groove Collective, We the People (Giant Step, 1996)
 New York Voices, New York Voices Sing the Songs of Paul Simon (RCA Victor, 1998)
 Sanne Salomonsen with Chris Minh Doky, In a New York Minute (Virgin, 1998)
 Jacky Terrasson, What It Is (Blue Note, 1999)
 Michael Philip Mossman, The Orisha Suite (Connector Music, 2001)
 Vitamin C, More (Elektra, 2000)
 Mingus Big Band, Tonight at Noon (Dreyfus, 2002)
 Michael Brecker, Wide Angles (Verve, 2003)
 Josh Roseman, Treats for the Nightwalker (Enja, 2003)
 Lizz Wright, Salt (Verve, 2003)
 Erin Bode, Don't Take Your Time (MAXJAZZ, 2004)
 Dennis Chambers, Planet Earth (BHM, 2005)
 Chiara Civello, Last Quarter Moon (Verve Forecast, 2005)
 Brooke Valentine, Chain Letter (Virgin, 2005)
 Malene Mortensen, Malene (Stunt, 2006)
 Brian Lynch, Eddie Palmieri, Simpatico (ArtistShare, 2006)
 Kenji Ozawa, Ecology of Everyday Life (Eastworld, 2006)
 Marcus Miller, Renaissance (Concord, Jazz, 2012)
 John Escreet, Sabotage and Celebration (Whirlwind, 2013)
 Forq, FORQ (Ropeadope/GroundUP music, 2014)
 Gonzalo Rubalcaba, Charlie (5Passion, 2015)
 Antonio Sanchez, The Meridian Suite (CAM Jazz, 2015)
 Nate Smith, Kinfolk: Postcards from Everywhere (Ropeadope, 2017)
 Tia Fuller, Diamond Cut (Mack Avenue, 2018)
 Joe Locke, Subtle Disguise (Origin, 2018)

References

External links
 Official site
 All About Jazz interview
 "A Guitarist-Led Quintet, Packing a Forceful Arsenal"
 "Adam Rogers", Jazz Times article by Bill Milkowski

Living people
American classical guitarists
American male guitarists
American jazz guitarists
Criss Cross Jazz artists
Guitarists from New York (state)
1965 births
20th-century American guitarists
Classical musicians from New York (state)
20th-century American male musicians
American male jazz musicians
Forq members